Deh Neseh-e Deli Gerdu-ye Sofla (also Romanized as Deh Neseh-e Delī Gerdū-ye Soflá; also known as Deh Neseh-e Delī Gerdū) is a village in Margown Rural District, Margown District, Boyer-Ahmad County, Kohgiluyeh and Boyer-Ahmad Province, Iran. At the 2006 census, its population was 120, in 22 families.

References 

Populated places in Boyer-Ahmad County